Dedman is a surname. Notable people with the surname include:

Bill Dedman (born 1960), American journalist, Pulitzer Prize winner and bestselling author
John Dedman (1896–1973), Minister in the Australian Labor Party governments led by John Curtin and Ben Chifley
Stephen Dedman (born 1959), Australian author of dark fantasy and science fiction stories and novels

See also
Dedman College of Humanities and Sciences of Southern Methodist University
Dedman School of Hospitality, located in Tallahassee, Florida
Dedman School of Law Southern Methodist University School of Law